USS Portsmouth was constructed for the United States Navy in 1798 by master shipbuilder James Hackett to a design of Josiah Fox at what is now Badger's Island in Kittery, Maine, directly across the Piscataqua River from Portsmouth, New Hampshire. She was built with funds contributed by the citizens of Portsmouth.

Commanded by Captain Daniel McNeil, Portsmouth operated in the West Indies during the Quasi-War with France in the squadron commanded by Commodore John Barry. In 1800, she sailed to France to bring back the United States envoys who had concluded peace negotiations with France. After a second cruise in the Caribbean, Portsmouth was sold less than three years later at Baltimore, Maryland, in 1801, after the military cutbacks ordered by the new Jefferson Administration after the peace signed with France ending the Quasi-War in 1800.

References

Ships of the United States Navy
Age of Sail naval ships of the United States
Ships built in Kittery, Maine
1798 ships